Fania (Fagnan; also called Kulaale) is an Adamawa language of Chad. The northern and southern dialects are rather divergent.

Names
Fania is an exonym. Speakers refer to their own language as Kulaale, their people as Kulaaway, and one person as Kulaanu.

Names listed in Boyeldieu, et al. (2018:56):
Autonym in Khalil Alio: Ɛma [ɛma] / pl. Ɛiwɛ [ɛɪwɛ]
Autonym in Tilé Nougar: Kulaanum [kʊ̀láːnʊ́m] / pl. Kulaaway [kʊ̀láːwɐ̀y]
Glossonym: Kulaale [kʊ̀láːlɛ̀] / pl. Kulaaru [kʊ̀láːɽʊ̀]

Villages
Ethnologue (22nd ed.) lists Karo, Malakonjo, Rim, Sengué, and Sisi villages (Mouraye area north of Sarh) as Fania locations. Lionnet also lists the village of Tili Nugar (Tilé Nougar).

References

Languages of Chad
Bua languages